Fill This House is an album by Shirley Caesar. It earned Caesar a Grammy Award nomination for Best Gospel Album.

Track listing
 "It’s Alright, It’s Ok" (feat. Anthony Hamilton)
 "He Won’t Fail You"
 "Survive This" (feat. Hezekiah Walker)
 "Fill This House"
 "Need Him Now"
 "Mother Emanuel"
 "Prayer Changes Things"
 "Be Happy (I Command U to Live)"
 "Sow Righteous Seeds (Hymn)"
 "Sow Righteous Seeds"
 "Prayer Works"

Charts

References

2016 albums
Shirley Caesar albums